Raise the Roof may refer to:

Film
 Raise the Roof (film), a 1930 film directed by Walter Summers
 Raise the Roof, a 2015 documentary film about the construction of a replica of the Gwoździec Synagogue

Music
 Raise the Roof (composition), a timpani concerto by Michael Daugherty
 "Raise the Roof" (Tracey Thorn song)
 "Raise the Roof" (Luke song), a song by Luke from his 1998 album Changin' the Game
 "Raise the Roof" (Morten Hampenberg og Alexander Brown song), a 2012 song by Morten Hampenberg & Alexander Brown featuring Fatman Scoop, Pitbull and Nabiha
 "Raise the Roof", a song from the 2000 musical The Wild Party
 "Raise the Roof", a song by NCT U from their album NCT 2020 Resonance Pt. 2 .
 Raise the Roof (album), a 2021 collaboration album by Robert Plant and Alison Krauss

Other uses
 Raise the Roof (game show), a British television game show
 Raise the Roof (producer), a Broadway theatre production group
 Raise the Roof, a book by Pat Summitt

See also 
 Raising the Roof, a 1972 British comedy film
 Raising the Roofs, a 2006 American reality television show